This is a list of the women's singles tennis champions at the Grand Slam tournaments, the WTA championships, the Olympic Games, and the WTA Tier I/Premier (Premier Mandatory and Premier Five)/1000 tournaments since 1990.

Champions list

Title leaders 
The leaders in these tournaments since 1990 are (5+ total titles):
 Important note: by setting 1990 as the cut-off point, this list excludes many notable champions in high level tournaments from the previous years. High category tournaments equivalent to Tier 1/Premier/WTA 1000 existed before 1990, and the Grand Slam tournaments, Olympic Games and WTA Finals have been held since 1884, 1900 and 1972, respectively. See the all-time records article for records spanning the sport's history. Totals including titles won before 1990 are in brackets.
Active players and records since 1990 are denoted in bold.

See also 
List of WTA Tour top-level tournament doubles champions
List of Grand Slam women's singles champions
WTA Tier I tournaments
List of Olympic medalists in tennis
List of ATP Tour top-level tournament singles champions
List of ATP Tour top-level tournament doubles champions

Notes

References 

WTA Tour
top-level
WTA Tour